Mohan Koiralaka Kavita is an anthology of poems by Mohan Koirala. It was published in 1973 (2030 BS) by Sajha Publications. The poet is renowned for his long poems and introducing experimental and modernist style in Nepali literature. The book was edited by Dr. Ishwar Baral. Koirala won the Sajha Puraskar for this book.

Synopsis 
The book contained all the poems of the poet published in various journals and newspaper between 1953 and 1971. Pharsiko Jhara, Lek, Surya Dan, Himchuli Raktim Cha are some of the poems included in this anthology.

Reception 
The book won the prestigious Sajha Puraskar for 2030 BS. The award is given every year to the best book published by the publication within that year. The poet also started getting national recogintion after publishing this book.

See also 

 Bairagi Kailaka Kabitaharu
 Ghumne Mechmathi Andho Manche
 Muna Madan
 Tarun Tapasi

References 

20th-century Nepalese books
1973 poetry books
Nepalese poetry collections
Sajha Puraskar-winning works
Nepali-language books